"Agoraea" and "Agoraeus" (Ancient Greek: Ἀγοραία, Agoraia and , Agoraios) were epithets given to several divinities of Greek mythology who were considered to be the protectors of the assemblies of the people in the agora, particularly in Athens, Sparta, and Thebes. The gods so named were Zeus, Athena, Artemis, and Hermes.  As Hermes was the god of commerce, this epithet seems to have reference to the agora as the marketplace; a bronze statue of Hermes Agoraeus is mentioned as standing near the agora in Athens by both Aristophanes and Demosthenes.

The Agoraios Kolonos, or "Market Hill", was a precinct on the westernmost boundary of the agora in Athens.

See also

Notes

References 

 Aristophanes, Knights from The Complete Greek Drama, vol. 2. Eugene O'Neill, Jr. New York. Random House. 1938. Online version at the Perseus Digital Library.
Aristophanes, Aristophanes Comoediae edited by F.W. Hall and W.M. Geldart, vol. 1. F.W. Hall and W.M. Geldart. Oxford. Clarendon Press, Oxford. 1907.  Greek text available at the Perseus Digital Library.
Pausanias, Description of Greece with an English Translation by W.H.S. Jones, Litt.D., and H.A. Ormerod, M.A., in 4 Volumes. Cambridge, MA, Harvard University Press; London, William Heinemann Ltd. 1918. . Online version at the Perseus Digital Library
Pausanias, Graeciae Descriptio. 3 vols. Leipzig, Teubner. 1903.  Greek text available at the Perseus Digital Library.

Epithets of Athena
Epithets of Artemis

Economy of ancient Greece